José Ángel "Carita" López Rivera (born March 29, 1972) is a Puerto Rican former professional boxer who has competed in the flyweight and super flyweight divisions. His first professional championship was the Puerto Rican flyweight title, which won by defeating José Luis De Jesús. López's first championship opportunity was against Alberto Jiménez for the World Boxing Organization's flyweight title, in a contest that he lost by unanimous decision. This was followed by three more world championships fights, two of them for major titles. However, López lost these contests by unanimous decision. On June 23, 2001, López won the WBO Latino super flyweight title. After losing to Fernando Montiel in his fifth world title opportunity, he recurred to fight for regional championships. From 2001 to 2008, López compiled an undefeated record consisting of 14 wins and a single draw. On March 28, 2009, López defeated Pramuansak Phosuwan to win the WBO's super flyweight world championship.

Professional career
López debuted on November 27, 1991, competing against Juan Cruz, in a contest that ended with a draw. In an immediate rematch, Cruz won by points. Subsequently, López defeated Daniel Pérez, Melquiades Ventura, José Ayala and Victor Cruz before losing to Andy Agosto by points. Following this fight, he defeated eleven consecutive opponents by knockout, in the process defeating José Luis De Jesús for the Puerto Rican flyweight title. Among the pugilist defeated were: Neil Swain, Julio César Acevedo, Alberto Cantú and Andres Buchito Adames. López's first world title fight was against Alberto Jiménez for the World Boxing Organization's flyweight championship, losing it by unanimous decision. He would defeat Miguel Santos, Martin Solorio, José Luis Zepeda and Fernando Valencia by knockout before receiving a second opportunity for the organism's championship. The incumbent, Carlos Gabriel Salazar, retained by unanimous decision in a fight card organized in Argentina. After winning two more fights by knockout, López fought against Isidro García for the vacant title. García, who replaced Alejandro Montiel prior to the fight, won by unanimous decision. After defeating Iván Salazar and Rafael Orozco by knockout, López moved up one division to challenge Mauricio Pastrana for the International Boxing Association's super flyweight championship, but lost by unanimous decision.

Regional championships
On June 23, 2001, López defeated Javier Cintrón by technical knockout to win the WBO Latino super flyweight title. After losing his third fight for the WBO flyweight championship to Fernando Montiel in a fight where he scored a knockdown in the ninth round, López began defending the regional title, beginning an undefeated streak of six years. On June 7, 2002, he defeated Alejandro Moreno by unanimous decision, as part of a card held in Reno, Nevada. Three months later, López was paired against Alberto Ontiveros, winning by technical knockout in three rounds. On September 19, 2003, he returned to action following a year of inactivity. In this contest, López defeated Everardo Morales by unanimous decision, winning the WBO Latino flyweight championship. On December 12, 2003, he competed against Juan Alfonso Keb Baas, receiving a draw from the judges. In his first defense of the WBO Latino title, López defeated Omar Soto by knockout in two rounds. On June 25, 2004, he defended the regional title in Puerto Rico, winning against Javier Cintrón by technical knockout. This was followed by a rematch against Keb Baas, whom he defeated by technical knockout in eleven rounds. In his only fight of 2005, López won by knockout against Luis Ángel Martínez in an unification fight, which also included the World Boxing Council's FECARBOX flyweight title. On April 1, 2006, he fought against Ilido Julio for the WBC Latino flyweight championship, winning by technical knockout. This was followed by a contest versus former world champion Kermin Guardia, whom he defeated by unanimous decision in ten rounds. On December 16, 2006, López defeated the incumbent Mexican flyweight champion, Juan Alberto Rosas, by majority decision. In his only fight of 2007, he fought Antonio María Cochero Díaz, winning by unanimous decision. On April 5, 2008, López received his second regional championship opportunity in the super flyweight limit. He challenged Juan Mercedes for the WBO Latino super flyweight title, defeating him by technical knockout in four rounds. Four months later, he was paired against Oscar Andrade, receiving a technical knockout victory. The outcome was product of referee intervention after was knocked down on three occasions. On October 4, 2008, López defended the WBO Latino super flyweight title for the first time, defeating Jonathan Pérez by technical knockout in seven rounds.

Winning and defending the WBO super flyweight title
López became the second contender for the title held by Montiel. However, Bob Arum, Montiel's promoter, announced on January 8, 2009, that he was having difficulty to make the flyweight limit, choosing to vacate the championship. Nonito Donaire, who was scheduled to fight against Montiel, was the considered López's next opponent. Ultimately, Pramuansak Phosuwan was the pugilist selected to fight for the vacant title. The card, which was held at the Coliseo Rubén Rodríguez in Bayamón, marked the first time that López fought for a world championship in Puerto Rico. In the first round both pugilists were effective in their offense, with López scoring more often. The following round, Phosuwan was able to connect while avoiding damage. After the third stanza, both fighters were more aggressive, which favored López, who connected with jabs and power punches. In the sixth, Phosuwan returned to the offensive, pushing his opponent to the ropes with combinations. Early in the following round both pugilists traded combinations, with López landing a solid punch before the recess. At this stage of the contest, Phosuwan began displaying symptoms of exhaustion. López dominated the ninth and tenths rounds, which featured pauses to fix the tape around his gloves. This pattern continued during the following chapter, Phosuwan was injured before the bell. In the last round, both traded punches and combinations, with Phosuwan being more active on the offensive. The judges presented scorecards of 116-112 and 117-111 twice, all in favor of López. In his first defense, the pugilist competed against Marvin Sonsona. However, the challenger was able to keep López on the defensive following a knockdown in the fourth round. Consequently, Sonsona received a unanimous decision of 114-111, 115-110 and 116-109. After eleven months of inactivity, López returned to activity against fellow Puerto Rican and the International Boxing Organization's flyweight champion, César Seda Jr., at a catch weight. A week before the contest, a case filed by PR Best Boxing, who claimed that they still had a fight left in his contract, was dismissed. This allowed López participation in the card organized by Javier Bustillo's Universal Promotions, which promotes Seda.

Professional championships

See also 
 List of Puerto Ricans
 List of Puerto Rican boxing world champions

References

External links

Living people
1972 births
People from Trujillo Alto, Puerto Rico
Flyweight boxers
Super-flyweight boxers
World Boxing Organization champions
World super-flyweight boxing champions
World boxing champions
Puerto Rican male boxers